This is a timeline documenting the events of heavy metal in the year 2024.

Artists with material in production
 Cradle of Filth
 Death Angel
 Dream Theater
 Exodus
 Judas Priest
 Kittie
 Nightwish
 Saxon
 Sodom
 Testament

References

Heavy Metal